Minnesota State Highway 92 (MN 92) is a  highway in northwest Minnesota, which runs from its intersection with State Highway 32 in Lake Pleasant Township near Red Lake Falls and continues east and then south to its eastern terminus at its intersection with State Highway 200 at Zerkel, south of the city of Bagley.

Route description
Highway 92 serves as an east–west and north–south route in northwest Minnesota between Red Lake Falls, Brooks, Clearbrook, Bagley, and Zerkel.

The highway is officially marked as an east–west route by its highway shields from beginning to end.

The section of Highway 92 at Zerkel passes through the White Earth State Forest.

The route is legally defined as Constitutional Route 65 and Legislative Route 169 in the Minnesota Statutes. It is not marked with these numbers.

History
Highway 92 was marked in 1934. The section between U.S. Highway 2 at Bagley and State Highway 32 was previously marked 65.

From 1934 to 1950, Highway 92 extended on the southeast end to U.S. 71 at Lake Itasca.  From 1950 to 1963, Highway 92 extended even further east to Highway 371 at Walker, over what was originally State Highway 85.  This Highway 92 extension later became State Highway 31 and is now part of present day State Highway 200.

The route was paved northwest of U.S. 2 by 1940. The remaining part of the route was paved by 1953.

Major intersections

References

092
Transportation in Red Lake County, Minnesota
Transportation in Polk County, Minnesota
Transportation in Clearwater County, Minnesota